The Third Jonckheer cabinet was the 3rd cabinet of the Netherlands Antilles.

Composition
The cabinet was composed as follows:

|Minister of General Affairs
|Efrain Jonckheer
|DP
|2 November 1962
|-
|Minister of Justice
|Ramez Jorge Isa
|DP
|2 November 1962
|-
|rowspan="2"|Minister of Finance, Welfare
|Oscar S. Henriquez
|PPA
|2 November 1962
|-
|Ernesto O. Petronia
|PPA
|24 April 1963
|-
|Minister of Social Affairs, Economic Affairs, Public Health
|Ciro Domenico Kroon
|DP
|2 November 1962
|-
|Minister of Education, Culture
|Ernesto O. Petronia
|PPA
|2 November 1962
|-
|rowspan="2"|Minister of Traffic and Communications
|Ernesto O. Petronia
|PPA
|2 November 1962
|-
|Julius R.L. Beaujon
|PPA
|9 July 1963
|}

References

Cabinets of the Netherlands Antilles
1962 establishments in the Netherlands Antilles
Cabinets established in 1962
Cabinets disestablished in 1966
1966 disestablishments in the Netherlands Antilles